The Major of the Tower of London, later also styled Resident Governor, was an officer of the Tower of London, subordinate to the Constable and the Lieutenant.

List of majors of the Tower
 Richard White
 1747: Charles Rainsford
 1750: Charles Henry Collins
 1778: John Parr
 1785: John Shrimpton
 1788: Lloyd Hill
 1793: Matthew Smith
 1812: Lachlan Maclean
 4 July 1816: John Henry Elrington
 31 March 1857: Frederick Amelius Whimper
 29 August 1870: George Bryan Milman
 2 July 1909: Henry Pipon
 1 July 1923: Daniel Burges
 1 July 1933: William Frederick Oliver Faviell
 1 July 1945: Edward Hamilton Carkeet-James
 1 July 1955: Leslie Frederic Ethelbert Wieler
 1 July 1961: Sir Thomas Pierce Butler
Butler was additionally appointed Keeper of the Jewel House on 5 February 1968, and the two posts have remained united since.

References

Tower of London